Piranhas is a 2019 Italian drama film directed by Claudio Giovannesi. It was selected to compete for the Golden Bear at the 69th Berlin International Film Festival, where it won the Silver Bear for Best Screenplay.

Plot
A group of 15-year-old boys from the neighbourhood Rione Sanità in Naples, dreaming to gain power and easy money, make their way on to the city's world of crime. In the unconsciousness of their age, they live between good and evil deeds, thinking that crime can be their only chance of life.

Cast

 Francesco Di Napoli as Nicola
 Viviana Aprea as Letizia
 Alfredo Turitto as Biscottino
 Ar Tem as Tyson
 Carmine Pizzo as Limone
 Ciro Pellechia as Lollipop
 Ciro Vecchione as 'O Russ
 Luca Nacarlo as Cristian
 Mattia Piano Del Balzo as Briatò
 Pasquale Marotta as Agostino Striano
 Valentina Vannino as Nicola's mother
 Adam Jendoubi as Aucelluzzo

Reception
The film received critical acclaim at the 69th Berlin International Film Festival. The site's critical consensus reads, "Piranhas fails to be anything more than another run-of-the-mill gangster drama." On Metacritic, the film has a weighted average score of 57 out of 100 based on 13 critics, indicating "mixed or average reviews". The Upcoming gave it five stars out of five.

References

External links
 

2019 films
2019 drama films
2019 action drama films
2019 crime action films
Italian drama films
Hood films
Italian action drama films
Italian crime action films
2010s Italian-language films
Films set in Naples